Escada is a German designer clothing company. Escada may also refer to:

Escada, Pernambuco, a city in northeastern Brazil
Alain Escada (born 1970), Belgian far-right activist